Frank Morris (May 20, 1923 – April 10, 2009) was a professional Canadian football offensive lineman and defensive lineman who played 14 seasons in the Canadian professional leagues for the Toronto Argonauts and the Edmonton Eskimos. He was a part of six Grey Cup championship teams (three with the Argonauts and three with the Eskimos) as a player and seven Grey Cup teams as a member of management and player personnel. He was inducted into the Canadian Football Hall of Fame in 1983.

Morris died on April 10, 2009, in Edmonton following a lengthy illness.

References 

1923 births
2009 deaths
Canadian football defensive linemen
Canadian Football Hall of Fame inductees
Canadian football offensive linemen
Edmonton Elks players
Players of Canadian football from Ontario
Canadian football people from Toronto
Toronto Argonauts players